Liphakoe is a community council located in the Quthing District of Lesotho. Its population in 2006 was 14,537.

Villages
The community of Liphakoe includes the villages of Borokhong, Duba-Duba, Ha Felix, Ha Lehlabela, Ha Lekhotso, Ha Lephutha, Ha Letsika, Ha Mahlaba, Ha Makepile, Ha Makoqoko, Ha Marase, Ha Mathabela, Ha Mathabeng (Thoteng), Ha Mofetoli, Ha Mokola, Ha Ntho, Ha Rakhoboli, Ha Ramohanoe, Ha Rashoalane, Ha Ratema, Ha Sephamo, Ha Sikara, Hekeng, K'hok'hobe, Koung, Lekhalong, Lekhotleng, Leloaleng, Lipeleng, Lower Moyeni, Maboelleng, Makanese, Mampoboleng, Mohloling, Mokanametsong, Motse-mocha, Motse-mocha (Ha Sikara), Police Line, Sekantšing, Thaba-Chitja, Thabaneng, Thabong, Thoteng, Upper Moyeni and Welkom.

References

External links
 Google map of community villages

Populated places in Quthing District